Blake Coleman (born November 28, 1991), nicknamed "Pickles", is an American professional ice hockey winger for the Calgary Flames of the National Hockey League (NHL). He was selected in the third round, 75th overall, by the New Jersey Devils during the 2011 NHL Entry Draft. 

Coleman won back-to-back Stanley Cup championships with the Tampa Bay Lightning in 2020 and 2021, becoming just the second Texas-born player to win the Stanley Cup (after Brian Leetch won with the New York Rangers in 1994) and first to be exclusively trained in the state.

Early life
Coleman was born on November 28, 1991, in Plano, Texas to parents Sandy and Rusty. He was born into an athletic family; his father played football at Oklahoma University and his sister Brooke played volleyball at Ohio University. His grandmother sparked his interest in ice hockey and she took him to Dallas Stars games as a toddler. Coleman eventually learned to skate at the age of five at a rink in Irving, Texas before one opened in Plano.

Playing career
As a youth, Coleman played in the 2004 Quebec International Pee-Wee Hockey Tournament with the Dallas Alliance minor ice hockey team.

Coleman played at the collegiate level for the Miami RedHawks. After completing his college career and graduating from Miami University, Coleman signed a two-year entry-level contract with the New Jersey Devils. He was assigned to the Devils' AHL affiliate, the Albany Devils to begin his professional career in the 2015–16 season.

During the 2016–17 season, Coleman appeared in 23 games for the Devils, and scored his first career goal on March 26 against the Dallas Stars in his 17th career game. On July 26, 2017, the Devils re-signed Coleman to a one-year, two-way contract worth $660,000. During the 2017–18 season, Coleman scored 13 goals and 12 assists for 25 points, in addition to 2 goals in the playoffs. On July 17, 2018, Coleman again re-signed with the Devils to a three-year, $5.4 million contract.

On February 16, 2020, Coleman was traded to the Tampa Bay Lightning in exchange for Nolan Foote and a conditional first-round pick. He would earn back to back Stanley Cup championships while playing with the Lightning, contributing 24 points in 48 postseason games. 

On July 28, 2021, as a free agent, Coleman signed a six-year, $29.4 million contract with the Calgary Flames.

Personal life
In 2018, Coleman launched the Pickles Pals program, a community platform to support the Salvation Army Boys and Girls Club of Newark Ironbound. The aim of the platform was to develop academic programs and providing kids with the resources needed to succeed in school. The name developed from a nickname Coleman received after he was caught sipping pickle juice in the penalty box.

Coleman married his fiancée Jordan Daigle in the summer of 2019. They had their first child together, a girl, in 2020.

Career statistics

Regular season and playoffs

International

Awards and honors

References

External links
 

1991 births
Living people
Albany Devils players
American men's ice hockey centers
Calgary Flames players
Ice hockey people from Texas
Indiana Ice players
Miami RedHawks men's ice hockey players
New Jersey Devils draft picks
New Jersey Devils players
Sportspeople from Plano, Texas
Stanley Cup champions
Tampa Bay Lightning players
Tri-City Storm players